Houndé is a city located in the province of Tuy (of which it is the capital) in the Hauts-Bassins Region of Burkina Faso. It is situated about 100 km east by northeast of Bobo-Dioulasso along the trunk road Route nationale N1 to Ouagadougou.

References 

Populated places in the Hauts-Bassins Region